Maximilian Breunig (born 14 August 2000) is a German professional footballer who plays as a forward for 3. Liga club SC Freiburg II.

Personal life
He is the older brother of fellow Würzburger Kickers player Louis Breunig.

References

External links
 
 Profile at DFB

2000 births
Living people
Sportspeople from Würzburg
German footballers
Footballers from Bavaria
Association football forwards
Würzburger Kickers players
FC Ingolstadt 04 II players
FC Ingolstadt 04 players
FC Admira Wacker Mödling players
SC Freiburg II players
3. Liga players
Regionalliga players
Austrian Football Bundesliga players
German expatriate footballers
German expatriate sportspeople in Austria
Expatriate footballers in Austria